{{Infobox political party
| name = Lesotho Congress for Democracy
| logo = LCD circle logo.png
| logo_size = 100px
| colorcode = 
| leader = Mothetjoa Metsing
| chairperson = 
| president = 
| spokesperson = 
| founder = Ntsu Mokhehle
| slogan = Truth, Justice, PeaceNete, Toka, Khotso''
| foundation = 7 June 1997 
| split = Basutoland Congress Party
| ideology = Pan-AfricanismSocial democracy
| position = Centre-left
| headquarters = Bonhomme House, Maseru
| seats1_title = National Assembly
| seats1 = 
| international = Socialist International (Observer)
| colors = Black, Red, Green
| website = www.lcd.org.ls/
| flag = 
| country = Lesotho
}} 

The Lesotho Congress for Democracy''' (LCD) is a political party in Lesotho.

In 1997, Prime Minister Ntsu Mokhehle left the Basutoland Congress Party to form with his faction the new Lesotho Congress for Democracy. The new party won the 1998 elections with 60.7% of the popular vote and 79 out of 80 seats. Pakalitha Mosisili became the new party leader and prime minister. At the elections for the National Assembly, 25 May 2002, the party won 54.9% of popular votes and 77 out of 120 seats. In the 17 February 2007 parliamentary election, the party won 62 out of 120 seats.

Major splits from the party occurred in October 2001, when leading LCD members Kelebone Maope and Shakhane Mokhehle left the party to form the Lesotho People's Congress and in October 2006, when Tom Thabane left the party to form the All Basotho Convention. Prior to the Lesotho general election, 2012 the party split again with incumbent Prime Minister Pakalitha Mosisili forming the Democratic Congress and General Secretary Mothetjoa Metsing taking over the party leadership.

Electoral Performance

References

External links
Lesotho Congress for Democracy

1997 establishments in Lesotho
Pan-Africanism in Lesotho
Pan-Africanist political parties in Africa
Political parties established in 1997
Political parties in Lesotho
Social democratic parties in Africa
Socialism in Lesotho